The 1958 Montana Grizzlies football team represented the University of Montana in the 1958 NCAA University Division football season as a member of the Skyline Conference (Skyline). The Grizzlies were led by first-year head coach Ray Jenkins, played their home games at Dornblaser Field and finished the season with a record of zero wins and ten losses (0–10, 0–7 MSC).

Schedule

References

Montana
Montana Grizzlies football seasons
College football winless seasons
Montana Grizzlies football